Saddez Agricultural Pumping Complex ( – Mojtame` Tolombeh Hāy Keshāvarzy Pasht Jādeh Saddez) is a village in Howmeh Rural District, in the Central District of Andimeshk County, Khuzestan Province, Iran. At the 2006 census, its population was 11, in 4 families.

References 

Populated places in Andimeshk County